The Toyota CD engine is a   diesel engine used in the Toyota Corolla, RAV4, Avensis and other vehicles. The higher-output CD Series engines have now largely been replaced by the AD engine while low output applications where replaced by the ND engine. There were two versions: the 1CD-FTV and the more powerful 2CD variant.

1CD-FTV
The 1CD-FTV (2.0 D-4D) is a compact inline-four turbocharged diesel engine initially in the first generation Avensis on November 22, 1999

1st generation 
Technical specifications:
 Fuel injection system: common rail ,6 hole solenoid injectors with pilot injection
 Camshaft drive: timing belt
 Exhaust gas treatment: EGR equipped with catalyst;(EGR cooler on RAV4)
 Emission standard: Euro III
 Compression Ratio:18.6:1
 Fuel consumption combined: 
  emission combined: /km
Applications:

Non-Intercooled Non VGT

 at 4000 rpm,  at 2400 rpm (Europe, Net DIN)

 08.2000–09.2001 Eleventh generation Toyota Corolla (CDE110)
 10.2000–2004 Twelfth generation Toyota Corolla (CDE120)
 First Generation Corolla Verso

Intercooled Non VGT

 at 4000 rpm,  at 2000-2400 rpm (Europe, Net DIN)

 1999-2003 First generation Toyota Avensis
 Twelfth generation Toyota Corolla T-Spirit 5dr hatchback 

Intercooled VGT

 at 4000 rpm,  at 1800-3000 rpm (Europe, Net DIN)

 08.2001-?First generation Toyota Avensis Verso
 Second Generation Previa
 Second Generation RAV4

2nd Generation 
The 1CD-FTV was revised with a lower compression ratio and a second generation common rail system in preparation of then upcoming Euro IV emission standards. It was first introduced in the second generation Avensis in February 2003 where PM and NOX reducing D-CAT was also first implemented.

Technical specifications:
 Fuel injection system: common rail / on D-CAT Variants,6 hole solenoid injectors with pilot injection
 Camshaft drive: timing belt
 Exhaust gas treatment: EGR, equipped with cooler and catalyst; 4-way DPNR Catalyst and Exhaust Port Injection on D-CAT Variants
 Emission standard: Euro IV (Euro III: Corolla Verso)
 Compression Ratio:17.8:1
 Fuel consumption combined: 
  emission combined: /km
Applications:

Intercooled VGT with D-CAT

 at 4000 rpm,  at 2000-2200 rpm (Europe)

 02.2003- 06.2006 Second generation Toyota Avensis

Intercooled VGT

 at 3600 rpm,  at 2000-2200 rpm (Europe)
 Twelfth generation Toyota Corolla
 Second Generation Corolla Verso

References

CD engine
Diesel engines by model
Straight-four engines